The Netherlands was represented by Annie Palmen, with the song "Een speeldoos", at the 1963 Eurovision Song Contest, which took place on 23 March in London. Palmen was chosen internally as the Dutch representative by broadcaster NTS; she had previously taken part in the preselection in 1960.

The 1963 Dutch selection is notable for the fact that the National Songfestival could not be broadcast due to industrial action, also that the title and lyrics of the winning song were changed twice before the Eurovision final.

Before Eurovision

Nationaal Songfestival 1963
The national final was scheduled to take place at the Tivoli in Utrecht on 23 January. However, a dispute between NTS and the members of its orchestra had led to the latter declaring strike action, so the broadcast of the final had to be abandoned. Instead, Palmen performed the three songs ("Kijk, daar is de zon", "Geen ander" and "Hoor je mij") for the jury alone and "Geen ander" was chosen as the winner.

Before the Eurovision final the lyrics and song title were changed, firstly to "Een droombeld", then again to "Een speeldoos".

At Eurovision 
On the night of the final Palmen performed second in the running order, following the United Kingdom and preceding Germany. Voting was by each national jury awarding 5-4-3-2-1 points to their top five songs, and at the end of the evening "Een speeldoos" (along with the entries from Finland, Norway and Sweden) had failed to pick up a single point, the third time the Netherlands had finished at the foot of the scoreboard. The Netherlands thus became the first country to score nul points twice, and in consecutive years. The Dutch jury awarded its 5 points to contest winners Denmark.

The Dutch entry was conducted at the contest by the musical director Eric Robinson.

Voting 
The Netherlands did not receive any points at the 1963 Eurovision Song Contest.

References

External links 
 Dutch Preselection 1963

1963
Countries in the Eurovision Song Contest 1963
Eurovision